Genius at Work is a 1946 American comedy film directed by Leslie Goodwins and written by Monte Brice and Robert E. Kent. The film stars Wally Brown, Alan Carney, Anne Jeffreys, Lionel Atwill and Bela Lugosi. The film was released on October 20, 1946, by RKO Pictures.

It was the last of eight films starring the Brown-Carney comedy team, as well as the final feature film appearance of Atwill, who died in 1946 while filming a serial.

Plot

Jerry Miles and Mike Strager co-host a radio mystery series, "Crime of the Week," with young Ellen Brent writing their scripts. What she writes about the kidnapping of millionaire John Saunders by someone called "The Cobra" is suspiciously close to the facts of the case.

It turns out that the radio station's owner, Latimer Marsh (Lionel Atwill), is the Cobra, assisted in his diabolical crimes by Stone (Bela Lugosi), his sadistic butler. Chloroform is used on Ellen when she gets too close to the truth and an attempt is made to frame her for the kidnapping and a murder. The bumbling and cowardly Jerry and Mike try to be of help to her in their own way, but Lt. Rick Campbell is the one who ends up saving them all.

Cast 
Wally Brown as Jerry Miles
Alan Carney as Mike Strager
Anne Jeffreys as Ellen Brent
Lionel Atwill as Latimer Marsh / The Cobra
Bela Lugosi as Stone
Marc Cramer as Lt. Rick Campbell
Ralph Dunn as Lt. Gilley

References

External links 
 

1946 films
American black-and-white films
RKO Pictures films
Films scored by Roy Webb
Films directed by Leslie Goodwins
American comedy films
1946 comedy films
Films scored by Paul Sawtell
1940s English-language films
1940s American films